Qalaboyun (also, Kalaboyun and Kalaboyunlar) is a village and municipality in the Tovuz Rayon of Azerbaijan.  It has a population of 426.  The municipality consists of the villages of Qalaboyun and Xatıncan.

References 

Populated places in Tovuz District